Jack Price may refer to:

Jack Price (athlete) (1884–1965), British Olympic runner
Jack Price (Australian footballer) (1901–1941), Australian rules footballer
Jack Price (darts) (1928–2006), darts referee
Jack Price (footballer, born 1877) (1877–after 1903), English football forward with Small Heath, Doncaster Rovers and Stockport County
Jack Price (footballer, born 1900) (1900–1984), English football fullback with Bristol Rovers, Swindon Town, Brentford and Torquay United
Jack Price (footballer, born 1918) (1918–2013), English football forward with Hartlepools United and York City
Jack Price (footballer, born 1992), English football midfielder currently with Colorado Rapids
Jack Price (ice hockey) (1932–2011), Canadian ice hockey defenceman
Jack Price (rugby league), British rugby league footballer
Jack Price (rower) (born 1987), Australian rower
Jack Price (EastEnders), a character in British soap opera EastEnders

See also 
Jack Pryce
John Price (disambiguation)